The KC Masterpiece 400 was a Monster Energy NASCAR Cup Series race held on May 12, 2018, at Kansas Speedway in Kansas City, Kansas. Contested over 267 laps on the 1.5 mile (2.4 km) asphalt speedway, it was the 12th race of the 2018 Monster Energy NASCAR Cup Series season.

Report

Background

Kansas Speedway is a  tri-oval race track in Kansas City, Kansas. It was built in 2001 and hosts two annual NASCAR race weekends. The Verizon IndyCar Series also raced at here until 2011. The speedway is owned and operated by the International Speedway Corporation.

Entry list
Matt Kenseth, who last raced in the 2017 Ford EcoBoost 400, made his first Cup series return, in the No. 6 for Roush Fenway Racing, doing so part-time. This was also the first Cup race since the 2014 Quicken Loans Race for Heroes 500 where Trevor Bayne did not participate.

Final Practice

Qualifying

Qualifying results

Race

Stage Results

Stage 1
Laps: 80

Stage 2
Laps: 80

Final Stage Results

Stage 3
Laps: 107

Race statistics
 Lead changes: 7 among different drivers
 Cautions/Laps: 6 for 31
 Red flags: 1 for 13 minutes and 13 seconds
 Time of race: 2 hours, 53 minutes and 38 seconds
 Average speed:

Media

Television
Fox Sports covered their eighth race at the Kansas Speedway. Mike Joy, three-time Kansas winner Jeff Gordon and Darrell Waltrip called in the booth for the race. Jamie Little, Vince Welch and Matt Yocum handled the action on pit road for the television side.

Radio
MRN had the radio call for the race which was also simulcasted on Sirius XM NASCAR Radio. Alex Hayden, Jeff Striegle and Rusty Wallace called the race in the booth when the field raced through the tri-oval. Dave Moody covered the race from the Sunoco spotters stand outside turn 2 when the field is racing through turns 1 and 2. Mike Bagley called the race from a platform outside turn 4. Pete Pistone, Kim Coon, and Steve Post worked pit road for the radio side.

Standings after the race

Drivers' Championship standings

Manufacturers' Championship standings

Note: Only the first 16 positions are included for the driver standings.
. – Driver has clinched a position in the Monster Energy NASCAR Cup Series playoffs.

References

2018 in sports in Kansas
2018 Monster Energy NASCAR Cup Series
May 2018 sports events in the United States
NASCAR races at Kansas Speedway